is a Japanese footballer currently playing as a forward for FC Ryukyu.

Career statistics

Club
.

Notes

References

External links

1997 births
Living people
Association football people from Tochigi Prefecture
Japanese footballers
Rissho University alumni
Association football forwards
FC Ryukyu players
J2 League players